Mittler is a surname. Notable people with the surname include:

Barbara Mittler (born 1968), German sinologist
Franz Mittler (1893–1970), Austrian-born American composer, musician, and humorist
Leo Mittler (1893–1958), Austrian playwright, screenwriter and film director
Thomas E. Mittler (1928–2012), Austrian entomologist
Wolf Mittler (1918–2002), German radio host and journalist